

Events

Pre-1600
 328 – The official opening of Constantine's Bridge built over the Danube between Sucidava (Corabia, Romania) and Oescus (Gigen, Bulgaria) by the Roman architect Theophilus Patricius.
1316 – The Burgundian and Majorcan claimants of the Principality of Achaea meet in the Battle of Manolada.
1594 – Portuguese forces under the command of Pedro Lopes de Sousa begin an unsuccessful invasion of the Kingdom of Kandy during the Campaign of Danture in Sri Lanka.

1601–1900
1610 – John Guy sets sail from Bristol with 39 other colonists for Newfoundland.
1687 – Isaac Newton publishes Philosophiæ Naturalis Principia Mathematica.
1770 – The Battle of Chesma between the Russian Empire and the Ottoman Empire begins.
1775 – The Second Continental Congress adopts the Olive Branch Petition.
1803 – The Convention of Artlenburg is signed, leading to the French occupation of the Electorate of Hanover (which had been ruled by the British king).
1807 – In Buenos Aires the local militias repel the British soldiers within the Second English Invasion.
1809 – The Battle of Wagram between the French and Austrian Empires begins.
1811 – The Venezuelan Declaration of Independence is adopted by a congress of the provinces.
1813 – War of 1812: Three weeks of British raids on Fort Schlosser, Black Rock and Plattsburgh, New York commence.
1814 – War of 1812: Battle of Chippawa: American Major General Jacob Brown defeats British General Phineas Riall at Chippawa, Ontario.
1833 – Lê Văn Khôi along with 27 soldiers stage a mutiny taking over the Phiên An citadel, developing into the Lê Văn Khôi revolt against Emperor Minh Mạng.
  1833   – Admiral Charles Napier vanquishes the navy of the Portuguese usurper Dom Miguel at the third Battle of Cape St. Vincent.
1841 – Thomas Cook organises the first package excursion, from Leicester to Loughborough.
1852 – Frederick Douglass delivers his "What to the Slave Is the Fourth of July?" speech in Rochester, New York.
1859 – The United States discovers and claims Midway Atoll. 
1865 – The United States Secret Service begins operation. 
1884 – Germany takes possession of Cameroon.

1901–present
1915 – The Liberty Bell leaves Philadelphia by special train on its way to the Panama–Pacific International Exposition.  This is the last trip outside Philadelphia that the custodians of the bell intend to permit. 
1934 – "Bloody Thursday": The police open fire on striking longshoremen in San Francisco.
1935 – The National Labor Relations Act, which governs labor relations in the United States, is signed into law by President Franklin D. Roosevelt.
1937 – Spam, the luncheon meat, is introduced into the market by the Hormel Foods Corporation.
1940 – World War II: Foreign relations of Vichy France are severed with the United Kingdom.
1941 – World War II: Operation Barbarossa: German troops reach the Dnieper river.
1943 – World War II: An Allied invasion fleet sails for Sicily (Operation Husky, July 10, 1943).
  1943   – World War II: German forces begin a massive offensive against the Soviet Union at the Battle of Kursk, also known as Operation Citadel.
1945 – The United Kingdom holds its first general election in 10 years, which would be won by Clement Attlee's Labour Party. 
1946 – Micheline Bernardini models the first modern bikini at a swimming pool in Paris.
1948 – National Health Service Acts create the national public health system in the United Kingdom.
1950 – Korean War: Task Force Smith: American and North Korean forces first clash, in the Battle of Osan.
  1950   – Zionism: The Knesset passes the Law of Return which grants all Jews the right to immigrate to Israel.
1954 – The BBC broadcasts its first daily television news bulletin.
  1954   – Elvis Presley records his first single, "That's All Right", at Sun Records in Memphis, Tennessee.
1962 – The official independence of Algeria is proclaimed after an eight-year-long war with France.
1970 – Air Canada Flight 621 crashes in Brampton, Ontario, Canada, killing all 109 people on board.
1971 – The Twenty-sixth Amendment to the United States Constitution, lowering the voting age from 21 to 18 years, is formally certified by President Richard Nixon.
1973 – A boiling liquid expanding vapor explosion (BLEVE) in Kingman, Arizona, following a fire that broke out as propane was being transferred from a railroad car to a storage tank, kills eleven firefighters.
  1973   – Juvénal Habyarimana seizes power over Rwanda in a coup d'état.
1975 – Arthur Ashe becomes the first black man to win the Wimbledon singles title.
  1975   – Cape Verde gains its independence from Portugal.
1977 – The Pakistan Armed Forces under Muhammad Zia-ul-Haq seize power in Operation Fair Play and begin 11 years of martial law. Zulfikar Ali Bhutto, the first elected Prime Minister of Pakistan, is overthrown.
1980 – Swedish tennis player Björn Borg wins his fifth Wimbledon final and becomes the first male tennis player to win the championships five times in a row (1976–1980).  
1984 – The United States Supreme Court gives its United States v. Leon decision providing a good-faith exception from the Fourth Amendment exclusionary rule against use of evidence obtained through defective warrants in criminal trials.  
1987 – Sri Lankan Civil War: The LTTE uses suicide attacks on the Sri Lankan Army for the first time. The Black Tigers are born and, in the following years, will continue to kill with the tactic.
1989 – Iran–Contra affair: Oliver North is sentenced by U.S. District Judge Gerhard A. Gesell to a three-year suspended prison term, two years probation, $150,000 in fines and 1,200 hours community service. His convictions are later overturned.
1994 – Jeff Bezos founds Amazon.
1995 – Armenia adopts its constitution, four years after its independence from the Soviet Union.
1996 – Dolly the sheep becomes the first mammal cloned from an adult cell.
1997 – Sri Lankan Civil War: Sri Lankan Tamil MP A. Thangathurai is shot dead at Sri Shanmuga Hindu Ladies College in Trincomalee.
  1999   – U.S. President Bill Clinton imposes trade and economic sanctions against the Taliban regime in Afghanistan.
2003 – The World Health Organization announces that the 2002–2004 SARS outbreak has been contained.
2004 – The first direct Indonesian presidential election is held.
2006 – North Korea tests four short-range missiles, one medium-range missile and a long-range Taepodong-2. The long-range Taepodong-2 reportedly fails in mid-air over the Sea of Japan.
2009 – A series of violent riots break out in Ürümqi, the capital city of the Xinjiang Uyghur Autonomous Region in China.
  2009   – The largest hoard of Anglo-Saxon gold ever discovered in Britain, consisting of more than 1,500 items, is found near the village of Hammerwich, near Lichfield, Staffordshire.
2012 – The Shard in London is inaugurated as the tallest building in Europe, with a height of 310 metres (1,020 ft).
2016 – The Juno space probe arrives at Jupiter and begins a 20-month survey of the planet.
2022 – British government ministers Sajid Javid and Rishi Sunak resign from the second Johnson ministry, beginning the July 2022 United Kingdom government crisis.

Births

Pre-1600
 465 – Ahkal Mo' Naab' I, Mayan ruler (d. 524)
 980 – Mokjong of Goryeo, Korean king (d. 1009)
1029 – Al-Mustansir Billah, Fatimid caliph (d. 1094)
1321 – Joan of the Tower, English consort of David II of Scotland (d. 1362)
1466 – Giovanni Sforza, Italian nobleman (d. 1510)
1547 – Garzia de' Medici, Tuscan son of Cosimo I de' Medici, Grand Duke of Tuscany (d. 1562)
1549 – Francesco Maria del Monte, Italian cardinal and art collector (d. 1627)
1554 – Elisabeth of Austria, French queen (d. 1592)
1580 – Carlo Contarini, doge of Venice (d. 1656)
1586 – Thomas Hooker, English-born founder of the Colony of Connecticut (d. 1647)
1593 – Achille d'Étampes de Valençay, French military leader (d. 1646)

1601–1900
1653 – Thomas Pitt, English businessman and politician (d. 1726)
1670 – Dorothea Sophie of Neuburg, countess palatine (d. 1748)
1675 – Mary Walcott, American accuser and witness at the Salem witch trials (d. 1719)
1709 – Étienne de Silhouette, French translator and politician, Controller-General of Finances (d. 1767)
1717 – Peter III, Portuguese king (d. 1786)
1718 – Francis Seymour-Conway, 1st Marquess of Hertford, English politician, Lord Lieutenant of Ireland (d. 1794)
1745 – Carl Arnold Kortum, German physician and poet (d. 1824)
1755 – Sarah Siddons, English actress (d. 1831)
1780 – François Carlo Antommarchi, French physician (d. 1838)
1781 – Stamford Raffles, English politician, founded Singapore (d. 1826) 
1793 – Pavel Pestel, Russian officer (d. 1826)
1794 – Sylvester Graham, American minister and activist (d. 1851)
1801 – David Farragut, American admiral (d. 1870)
1802 – Pavel Nakhimov, Russian admiral (d. 1855)
1803 – George Borrow, British writer (d. 1881)
1805 – Robert FitzRoy, English captain, meteorologist, and politician, 2nd Governor of New Zealand (d. 1865)
1810 – P. T. Barnum, American businessman, co-founded Ringling Bros. and Barnum & Bailey Circus (d. 1891)
1820 – William John Macquorn Rankine, Scottish physicist, mathematician, and engineer (d. 1872)
1829 – Ignacio Mariscal, Mexican politician and diplomat, Secretary of Foreign Affairs for Mexico (d. 1910)
1832 – Pavel Chistyakov, Russian painter and educator (d. 1919)
1841 – William Collins Whitney, American financier and politician, 31st United States Secretary of the Navy (d. 1904)
1849 – William Thomas Stead, English journalist (d. 1912)
1853 – Cecil Rhodes, English-South African businessman and politician, 6th Prime Minister of the Cape Colony (d. 1902)
1857 – Clara Zetkin, German theorist and activist (d. 1933)
  1857   – Julien Tiersot, French musicologist and composer (d. 1936)
1860 – Robert Bacon, American colonel and politician, 39th United States Secretary of State (d. 1919)
  1860   – Mathieu Jaboulay, French surgeon (d. 1913)
1862 – George Nuttall, American-British bacteriologist (d. 1937)
  1862   – Horatio Caro, English chess master (d. 1920)
1864 – Stephan Krehl, German composer (d. 1924)
1867 – A. E. Douglass, American astronomer (d. 1962) 
1872 – Édouard Herriot, French lawyer and politician, Prime Minister of France (d. 1957)
1874 – Eugen Fischer, German physician and academic (d. 1967)
1879 – Dwight F. Davis, American tennis player and politician, 49th United States Secretary of War (d. 1945)
  1879   – Wanda Landowska, Polish-French harpsichord player and educator (d. 1959)
1880 – Jan Kubelík, Czech violinist and composer (d. 1940)
  1880   – Constantin Tănase, Romanian actor and playwright (d. 1945)
1882 – Inayat Khan, Indian mystic and educator (d. 1927)
1883 – Gustave Lanctot, Canadian historian, author, and academic (d. 1975)
1884 – Enrico Dante, Italian cardinal (d. 1967)
1885 – Blas Infante, Spanish historian and politician (d. 1936)
  1885   – André Lhote, French sculptor and painter (d. 1962)
1886 – Willem Drees, Dutch politician and historian, Prime Minister of the Netherlands (1948–1958) (d. 1988)
  1886   – Prince John Konstantinovich of Russia (d. 1918)
1888 – Herbert Spencer Gasser, American physiologist and academic, Nobel Prize laureate (d. 1963)
  1888   – Louise Freeland Jenkins, American astronomer and academic (d. 1970)
1889 – Jean Cocteau, French novelist, poet, and playwright (d. 1963)
1890 – Frederick Lewis Allen, American historian and journalist (d. 1954)
1891 – John Howard Northrop, American chemist and academic, Nobel Prize laureate (d. 1987)
  1891   – Tin Ujević, Croatian poet and translator (d. 1955)
1893 – Anthony Berkeley Cox, English writer (d. 1971)
  1893   – Giuseppe Caselli, Italian painter (d. 1976)
1894 – Ants Lauter, Estonian actor and director (d. 1973)
1896 – Thomas Playford IV, Australian politician, 33rd Premier of South Australia (d. 1981)
1898 – Georgios Grivas, Greek general (d. 1974)
1899 – Marcel Achard, French playwright, screenwriter, and author (d. 1974)
1900 – Yoshimaro Yamashina, Japanese ornithologist, founded the Yamashina Institute for Ornithology (d. 1989)
  1900   – Bernardus Johannes Alfrink, Dutch cardinal (d. 1987)

1901–present
1901 – Julio Libonatti, Italian-Argentinian footballer (d. 1981)
1902 – Henry Cabot Lodge Jr., American colonel and politician, 3rd United States Ambassador to the United Nations (d. 1985)
1904 – Harold Acton, English scholar and author (d. 1994)
  1904   – Ernst Mayr, German-American biologist and ornithologist (d. 2005)
  1904   – Milburn Stone, American actor (d. 1980)
1905 – Madeleine Sylvain-Bouchereau, Haitian sociologist and educator (d. 1970)
1908 – Henri of Orléans, (d. 1999)
  1908   – Lyman S. Ayres II, American businessman (d. 1996)
1910 – Georges Vedel, French lawyer and academic (d. 2002)
1911 – Endel Aruja, Estonian-Canadian physicist and academic (d. 2008)
  1911   – Haydn Bunton, Sr., Australian footballer and coach (d. 1955)
  1911   – Giorgio Borġ Olivier, Maltese lawyer and politician, 7th Prime Minister of Malta (d. 1980)
  1911   – Georges Pompidou, French banker and politician, 19th President of France (d. 1974)
1913 – George Costakis, Russian art collector (d. 1990)
  1913   – Smiley Lewis, American singer-songwriter and guitarist (d. 1966)
1914 – John Thomas Dunlop, American administrator and labor scholar (d. 2003)
1914 – Annie Fischer, Hungarian pianist and composer (d. 1995)
1915 – Babe Paley, American socialite (d. 1978)
  1915   – John Woodruff, American runner and commander (d. 2007)
  1915   – Al Timothy, Trinidadian musician and songwriter (d. 2000)
1916 – Lívia Rév, Hungarian classical pianist (d. 2018)
  1916   – Ivor Powell, Welsh footballer (d. 2012)
1918 – K. Karunakaran, Indian lawyer and politician, 7th Chief Minister of Kerala (d. 2010)
  1918   – Brian James, Australian actor (d. 2009)
  1918   – Zakaria Mohieddin, Egyptian general and politician, 33rd Prime Minister of Egypt (d. 2012)
  1918   – George Rochberg, American composer and educator (d. 2005)
1921 – Viktor Kulikov, Russian marshal (d. 2013)
  1921   – Nanos Valaoritis, Greek author, poet, and playwright (d. 2019)
1923 – George Moore, Australian jockey (d. 2008)
  1923   – Mitsuye Yamada, Japanese American activist
1924 – János Starker, Hungarian-American cellist and educator (d. 2013)
  1924   – Edward Cassidy, Australian Roman Catholic cardinal priest (d. 2021)
1925 – Fernando de Szyszlo, Peruvian painter and sculptor (d. 2017)
  1925   – Jean Raspail, French author and explorer (d. 2020)
1926 – Diana Lynn, American actress (d. 1971)
1928 – Pierre Mauroy, French educator and politician, Prime Minister of France (d. 2013)
  1928   – Warren Oates, American actor (d. 1982)
1929 – Jimmy Carruthers, Australian boxer (d. 1990)
  1929   – Katherine Helmond, American actress and director (d. 2019)
  1929   – Tony Lock, English cricketer (d. 1995)
  1929   – Jovan Rašković, Serbian psychiatrist, academic, and politician (d. 1992)
  1929   – Jiří Reynek, Czech poet and graphic artist (d. 2014)
1931 – Ismail Mahomed, South African lawyer and politician, 17th Chief Justice of South Africa (d. 2000)
1932 – Gyula Horn, Hungarian politician, 37th Prime Minister of Hungary (d. 2013)
1933 – Paul-Gilbert Langevin, French musicologist, critic and physicist (d. 1986)
1936 – Shirley Knight, American actress (d. 2020)
  1936   – James Mirrlees, Scottish economist and academic, Nobel Prize laureate (d. 2018)
1938 – Ronnie Self, American singer-songwriter (d. 1981)
1940 – Chuck Close, American painter and photographer (d. 2021)
1941 – Epeli Nailatikau, Fijian chief, President of Fiji
1942 – Matthias Bamert, Swiss composer and conductor
  1942   – Hannes Löhr, German footballer, coach, and manager (d. 2016)
1943 – Curt Blefary, American baseball player and coach (d. 2001)
  1943   – Mark Cox, English tennis player, coach and sportscaster
  1943   – Robbie Robertson, Canadian singer-songwriter, guitarist, producer, and actor 
1944 – Leni Björklund, Swedish politician, 28th Swedish Minister of Defence for Sweden
1945 – Michael Blake, American author and screenwriter (d. 2015)
  1945   – Humberto Benítez Treviño, Mexican lawyer and politician, Attorney General of Mexico
1946 – Pierre-Marc Johnson, Canadian lawyer, physician, and politician, 24th Premier of Quebec
  1946   – Paul Smith, English fashion designer
  1946   – Gerard 't Hooft, Dutch physicist and academic, Nobel Prize laureate
  1946   – Vladimir Mikhailovich Zakharov, Russian dancer and choreographer (d. 2013)
1949 – Ludwig G. Strauss, German physician and academic (d. 2013)
1950 – Carlos Caszely, Chilean footballer
  1950   – Huey Lewis, American singer-songwriter and actor  
1953 – Caryn Navy, American mathematician and computer scientist
1954 – Jimmy Crespo, American guitarist and songwriter 
  1954   – John Wright, New Zealand cricketer and coach
1955 – Tony Hadley, English footballer
  1955   – Peter McNamara, Australian tennis player and coach (d. 2019)
1956 – Horacio Cartes, Paraguayan businessman and politician, President of Paraguay
  1956   – James Lofton, American football player and coach
1957 – Carlo Thränhardt, German high jumper
  1957   – Doug Wilson, Canadian-American ice hockey player and manager
1958 – Veronica Guerin, Irish journalist (d. 1996)
  1958   – Bill Watterson, American author and illustrator
1959 – Marc Cohn, American singer-songwriter and keyboard player
1960 – Pruitt Taylor Vince, American actor and director
1962 – Sarina Hülsenbeck, German swimmer
1963 – Edie Falco, American actress
1964 – Ronald D. Moore, American screenwriter and producer
1965 – Kathryn Erbe, American actress
  1965   – Eyran Katsenelenbogen, Israeli-American pianist and educator
1966 – Susannah Doyle, English actress, director, and playwright
  1966   – Gianfranco Zola, Italian footballer and coach
1967 – Mustafa Al-Kadhimi, Iraqi politician, 80th Prime Minister of Iraq
1968 – Ken Akamatsu, Japanese illustrator
  1968   – Kenji Ito, Japanese pianist and composer
  1968   – Nardwuar the Human Serviette, Canadian singer-songwriter and keyboard player 
  1968   – Hedi Slimane, French fashion designer and photographer
  1968   – Alex Zülle, Swiss cyclist
  1968   – Susan Wojcicki, Polish-American technology executive
1969 – Jenji Kohan, American screenwriter and producer
  1969   – Armin Kõomägi, Estonian author and screenwriter 
  1969   – John LeClair, American ice hockey player
  1969   – RZA, American rapper, producer, actor, and director 
1970 – Mac Dre, American rapper and producer, founded Thizz Entertainment (d. 2004)
  1970   – Valentí Massana, Spanish race walker
1971 – Derek McInnes, Scottish footballer and manager
1972 – Matthew Birir, Kenyan runner
  1972   – Robert Esmie, Canadian sprinter 
  1972   – Gary Shteyngart, American writer
1973 – Marcus Allbäck, Swedish footballer and coach
  1973   – Bengt Lagerberg, Swedish drummer 
  1973   – Róisín Murphy, Irish singer-songwriter and producer 
1974 – Márcio Amoroso, Brazilian footballer
  1974   – Sarah Taylor, Jersey squash player
1975 – Hernán Crespo, Argentinian footballer and coach
  1975   – Ai Sugiyama, Japanese tennis player
1976 – Bizarre, American rapper 
  1976   – Nuno Gomes, Portuguese footballer
1977 – Nicolas Kiefer, German tennis player
  1977   – Steven Sharp Nelson, American cellist
1978 – Britta Oppelt, German rower
  1978   – Allan Simonsen, Danish race car driver (d. 2013)
  1978   – İsmail YK, German-Turkish singer-songwriter 
1979 – Shane Filan, Irish singer-songwriter 
  1979   – Amélie Mauresmo, French-Swiss tennis player
  1979   – Stiliyan Petrov, Bulgarian footballer and manager
1980 – David Rozehnal, Czech footballer
  1980   – Mads Tolling, Danish-American violinist and composer 
  1980   – Jason Wade, American singer-songwriter and guitarist 
1982 – Fabrício de Souza, Brazilian footballer
  1982   – Alexander Dimitrenko, Ukrainian-German boxer
  1982   – Alberto Gilardino, Italian footballer
  1982   – Philippe Gilbert, Belgian cyclist
  1982   – Kate Gynther, Australian water polo player
  1982   – Dave Haywood, American singer-songwriter and guitarist 
  1982   – Paíto, Mozambican footballer
  1982   – Javier Paredes, Spanish footballer
  1982   – Szabolcs Perenyi, Romanian-Hungarian footballer
  1982   – Beno Udrih, Slovenian basketball player
  1982   – Tuba Büyüküstün, Turkish actress
  1982   – Junri Namigata, Japanese tennis player
1983 – Marco Estrada, Mexican baseball player
  1983   – Jonás Gutiérrez, Argentinian footballer
  1983   – Zheng Jie, Chinese tennis player
  1983   – Taavi Peetre, Estonian shot putter (d. 2010)
1984 – Danay Garcia, Cuban actress
  1984   – Zack Miller, American golfer
1985 – Alexandre R. Picard, Canadian ice hockey player
  1985   – Megan Rapinoe, American soccer player
1986 – Iurii Cheban, Ukrainian canoe sprinter
  1986   – Piermario Morosini, Italian footballer (d. 2012)
  1986   – Alexander Radulov, Russian ice hockey player
  1986   – Owl City, American singer, songwriter and composer
1987 – Ji Chang-wook, South Korean actor
  1987   – Mohd Safiq Rahim, Malaysian footballer
  1987   – Andrija Kaluđerović, Serbian footballer
  1987   – Alexander Kristoff, Norwegian cyclist
1988 – Martin Liivamägi, Estonian swimmer
  1988   – Samir Ujkani, Albanian footballer
1989 – Charlie Austin, English footballer
  1989   – Georgios Efrem, Cypriot footballer
  1989   – Dwight King, Canadian ice hockey player
1990 – Abeba Aregawi, Ethiopian-Swedish runner
1992 – Alberto Moreno, Spanish footballer
  1992   – Chiara Scholl, American tennis player
1993 – Yaroslav Kosov, Russian ice hockey player
1994 – Diana Harkusha, Ukrainian lawyer, dancer, model and beauty queen
  1994   – Shohei Ohtani, Japanese baseball player
1998 – Emily Fox, American soccer player

Deaths

Pre-1600
 905 – Cui Yuan, Chinese chancellor
   905   – Dugu Sun, Chinese chancellor
   905   – Lu Yi, Chinese chancellor (b. 847)
   905   – Pei Shu, Chinese chancellor (b. 841)
   905   – Wang Pu, Chinese chancellor
 936 – Xu Ji, Chinese official and chancellor 
 967 – Murakami, Japanese emperor (b. 926)
1080 – Ísleifur Gissurarson, Icelandic bishop (b. 1006)
1091 – William of Hirsau, German abbot
1316 – Ferdinand, prince of Majorca (b. 1278)
1375 – Charles III, French nobleman (b. 1337)
1413 – Musa Çelebi, Ottoman prince and co-ruler 
1507 – Crinitus, Italian scholar and academic (b. 1475)
1539 – Anthony Maria Zaccaria, Italian saint (b. 1502)

1601–1900
1661 – Sir Hugh Speke, 1st Baronet
1666 – Albert VI, German nobleman (b. 1584)
1676 – Carl Gustaf Wrangel, Swedish field marshal and politician (b. 1613)
1715 – Charles Ancillon, French jurist and diplomat (b. 1659)
1719 – Meinhardt Schomberg, 3rd Duke of Schomberg, German-English general (b. 1641)
1773 – Francisco José Freire, Portuguese historian and philologist (b. 1719)
1819 – William Cornwallis, English admiral and politician (b.1744)
1826 – Stamford Raffles, English politician, founded Singapore (b. 1782)
1833 – Nicéphore Niépce, French inventor, created the first known photograph (b. 1765)
1859 – Charles Cagniard de la Tour, French physicist and engineer (b. 1777)
1862 – Heinrich Georg Bronn, German geologist and paleontologist (b. 1800)
1863 – Lewis Armistead, Confederate general (b. 1817)
1884 – Victor Massé, French composer (b. 1822)

1901–present
1908 – Jonas Lie, Norwegian author, poet, and playwright (b. 1833)
1920 – Max Klinger,  German painter and sculptor (b. 1857)
1927 – Albrecht Kossel, German physician and academic, Nobel Prize laureate (b. 1853)
1929 – Henry Johnson, American sergeant (b. 1897)
1932 – Sasha Chorny, Russian poet and author (b. 1880)
1935 – Bernard de Pourtalès, Swiss captain and sailor (b. 1870)
1937 – Daniel Sawyer, American golfer (b. 1884)
1943 – Kazimierz Junosza-Stępowski, Polish actor (b. 1880) 
  1943   – Karin Swanström, Swedish actress, director, and producer (b. 1873)
1945 – John Curtin, Australian journalist and politician, 14th Prime Minister of Australia (b. 1885)
1948 – Georges Bernanos, French soldier and author (b. 1888)
  1948   – Carole Landis, American actress (b. 1919)
  1948   – Piet Aalberse, Dutch politician (b. 1871)
1957 – Anugrah Narayan Sinha, Indian lawyer and politician, 1st Deputy Chief Minister of Bihar (b. 1887)
1965 – Porfirio Rubirosa, Dominican race car driver, polo player, and diplomat (b. 1909)
1966 – George de Hevesy, Hungarian-German chemist and academic, Nobel Prize laureate (b. 1885)
1969 – Wilhelm Backhaus, German pianist and educator (b. 1884)
  1969   – Walter Gropius, German architect, designed the John F. Kennedy Federal Building and Werkbund Exhibition (b. 1883)
  1969   – Tom Mboya, Kenyan politician, 1st Kenyan Minister of Justice (b. 1930)
  1969   – Leo McCarey, American director, producer, and screenwriter (b. 1898)
1975 – Gilda dalla Rizza, Italian soprano and actress (b. 1892)
1976 – Walter Giesler, American soccer player and referee (born 1910)
1983 – Harry James, American trumpet player and actor (b. 1916)
1984 – Chic Murray, Canadian politician, 2nd Mayor of Mississauga (b. 1914)
1991 – Howard Nemerov, American poet and essayist (b. 1920)
1995 – Jüri Järvet, Estonian actor and screenwriter (b. 1919)
1997 – A. Thangathurai, Sri Lankan Tamil lawyer and politician (b. 1936)
1998 – Sid Luckman, American football player (b. 1916)
2002 – Katy Jurado, Mexican actress (b. 1924)
  2002   – Ted Williams, American baseball player and manager (b. 1918)
2004 – Hugh Shearer, Jamaican journalist and politician, 3rd Prime Minister of Jamaica (b. 1923)
  2004   – Rodger Ward, American race car driver and sportscaster (b. 1921)
2005 – James Stockdale, American admiral (b. 1923)
2006 – Gert Fredriksson, Swedish canoe racer (b. 1919)
  2006   – Thirunalloor Karunakaran, Indian poet and scholar (b. 1924)
  2006   – Kenneth Lay, American businessman (b. 1942)
  2006   – Amzie Strickland, American actress (b. 1919)
2007 – Régine Crespin, French soprano (b. 1927)
  2007   – George Melly, English singer-songwriter and critic (b. 1926)
2008 – Hasan Doğan, Turkish businessman (b. 1956)
2010 – Bob Probert, Canadian ice hockey player and radio host (b. 1965)
2011 – Cy Twombly, American-Italian painter, sculptor, and photographer (b. 1928)
2012 – Rob Goris, Belgian cyclist (b. 1982)
  2012   – Gerrit Komrij, Dutch author, poet, and playwright (b. 1944)
  2012   – Colin Marshall, Baron Marshall of Knightsbridge, English businessman and politician (b. 1933)
  2012   – Ruud van Hemert, Dutch actor, director, producer, and screenwriter (b. 1938)
2013 – Bud Asher, American lawyer and politician (b. 1925)
  2013   – David Cargo, American politician, 22nd Governor of New Mexico (b. 1929)
  2013   – Lambert Jackson Woodburne, South African admiral (b. 1939)
2014 – Rosemary Murphy, American actress (b. 1925)
  2014   – Volodymyr Sabodan, Ukrainian metropolitan (b. 1935)
  2014   – Hans-Ulrich Wehler, German historian and academic (b. 1931)
  2014   – Brett Wiesner, American soccer player (b. 1983)
2015 – Uffe Haagerup, Danish mathematician and academic (b. 1949)
  2015   – Yoichiro Nambu, Japanese-American physicist and academic, Nobel Prize laureate (b. 1921)
2020 – Nick Cordero, Canadian actor and singer (b. 1978)
2021 – Raffaella Carrà, Italian singer, dancer, television presenter and actress (b. 1943)
  2021   – Richard Donner, American film director (b. 1930)

Holidays and observances
Bloody Thursday (International Longshore and Warehouse Union)
Christian feast day:
Anthony Maria Zaccaria, priest (d. 1539)
Cyril and Methodius (a public holiday in Czech Republic and Slovakia) 
Zoe of Rome (Roman Catholic Church)
July 5 (Eastern Orthodox liturgics)
Constitution Day (Armenia)
Fifth of July (New York), historic celebration of the abolition of slavery in New York in 1827.
Independence Day (Algeria), celebrating the independence of Algeria from France in 1962.
Independence Day (Cape Verde), celebrating the independence of Cape Verde from Portugal in 1975.
Independence Day (Venezuela), celebrating the independence of Venezuela from Spain in 1811; also National Armed Forces Day.
Tynwald Day, if July 5 is on a weekend, the holiday is the following Monday. (Isle of Man)

References

External links

 
 
 

Days of the year
July